Savaal is a 1981 Indian Tamil-language masala film directed by R. Krishnamoorthy, starring Kamal Haasan, Jaishankar, Vijayakumar, Sripriya and Lakshmi. The film was released on 3 July 1981 and did well at the box office. It is a remake of the Hindi film Haath Ki Safai (1974).

Plot 

Brothers Shankar and Raja lose their mother. For survival, they plan to go to the city via a goods train. However at a junction, they get split and lead separate lives. Shankar grows up to be a smuggler while Raja becomes a petty pickpocketing criminal. Radha, a wealthy girl, falls in love in Raja. How Shankar and Raja get united forms the story.

Cast 
Kamal Haasan as Raja
Jaishankar as Shankar
Vijayakumar as Ranjith
Sripriya as Radha
Lakshmi as Ganga
S. A. Ashokan as Jail inmate (cameo)
Thengai Srinivasan as Radha's guardian
Y. G. Mahendran as Johnny
Balaji as Baba 
Manorama as "Burma" Pappa

Soundtrack 
The music was composed by M. S. Viswanathan, with lyrics by Kannadasan and Vairamuthu.

Reception 
Nalini Sastri of Kalki called the film an entertaining masala fare.

References

External links 
 

1980s masala films
1980s Tamil-language films
1981 films
Films directed by R. Krishnamoorthy
Films scored by M. S. Viswanathan
Tamil remakes of Hindi films